Kursumli An is an Ottoman caravanserai located in the Old Town of Skopje. It is in the area of Museum of Macedonia. It has served as an inn and as a prison.

Kursumli An was built in the 15th or 16th century. There were stables for 100 horses.

The walls form a square but roof consists of pyramid-shaped domes. The domes were originally covered in lead, and this is why the serai is called "Lead Bazaar." Ground floor rooms were used for storage, upper floor for sleeping quarters. The building also featured rooms for livestock.

References 

Macedonian culture
Museums in North Macedonia
Buildings and structures in Skopje
Ottoman caravanserais
Buildings and structures completed in 1550
Caravanserais in North Macedonia
Caravanserais in the Balkans
Old Bazaar, Skopje